Helen Vaughn Michel (born 1932) is an American chemist best known for her efforts in fields including analytical chemistry and archaeological science, and specific processes such as neutron activation analysis and radiocarbon dating. Her work with Frank Asaro at the Lawrence Berkeley National Laboratory at the University of California (Berkeley) is particularly noteworthy as it includes the dating of Drake's Plate of Brass as well as the Alvarez hypothesis, the hypothesis that posits the Cretaceous–Paleogene extinction event.

Michel retired from the Lawrence Berkeley National Laboratory in 1990.

References 

Living people
1932 births
21st-century American chemists
University of California, Berkeley alumni
University of California, Berkeley faculty
Lawrence Berkeley National Laboratory people
American women chemists
21st-century American women scientists